Victor Bernth Kristiansen (born 16 December 2002) is a Danish professional footballer who plays as a left-back for Premier League club Leicester City.

Club career
A youth academy graduate of Copenhagen, Kristiansen made his senior team debut on 4 November 2020 in a 2–1 cup win against Avarta. He made his professional debut on 29 November 2020 in a 3–1 league win against SønderjyskE.

On 20 December 2020, four days after turning 18, Kristiansen signed a contract extension with Copenhagen which would run until December 2023.

On 20 January 2023, Kristiansen signed for Leicester City for a record-breaking fee of £17 million, making him the most expensive Danish Superliga player ever. He made his debut for Leicester as a substitution against Walsall in the FA Cup.

International career
Kristiansen is a current Danish youth international.

Career statistics

Honours
Copenhagen
 Danish Superliga: 2021–22

References

External links
Profile at the Leicester City F.C. website
 
 

2002 births
Living people
Danish men's footballers
Footballers from Copenhagen
Association football fullbacks
Denmark youth international footballers
Danish Superliga players
F.C. Copenhagen players